Encounter Bay was an electoral district of the House of Assembly in the Australian colony (state of Australia from 1901) of South Australia from 1857 to 1902.

At its creation in 1857, it included booths at Goolwa, Port Elliot, Rapid Bay and Yankalilla. It expanded over time with the settlement of the area to include booths at Cape Jervis, Inman Valley and Myponga (1870), Hog Bay and Port Victor (now Victor Harbor) (1875), Kingscote (1878), Bullaparinga (1881), Second Valley (1893, replacing Rapid Bay), Nangkita (1896) and Torrens Vale (1899).

In 2015, the former electorate of Encounter Bay is now divided between the state electorates of Finniss and Hammond.

Members

After Encounter Bay was abolished, Tucker went on to represent the new district of Alexandra from 3 May 1902.

See also
 Encounter (disambiguation)

References 

Former electoral districts of South Australia
1857 establishments in Australia
1902 disestablishments in Australia